A blue moon is an astronomical phenomenon.

Blue Moon may also refer to:

Film, television, and theatre
 The Blue Moon (film), a 1920 American silent drama film
 Blue Moon, a 1998 Taiwanese film featuring Tarcy Su

 Blue Moon (2000 film), an American comedy-drama film written and directed by John A. Gallagher
 Blue Moon (2002 film), an Austrian road movie/romantic comedy written and directed by Andrea Maria Dusl
 Blue Moon (2006 film), a Philippine romantic drama directed by Joel Lamangan

 Blue Moon (2021 film), a Romanian film by Alina Grigore, Golden Shell winner at the 69th San Sebastián International Film Festival
 The Blue Moon (musical), a 1905 London musical
 Blue Moon, a 2016–2018 TV series starring Karine Vanasse
 "Blue Moon" (American Horror Story), a 2021 television episode
 "Blue Moon" (Little Witch Academia), a 2017 television episode

Literature
 Blue Moon (Child novel), a 2019 Jack Reacher novel by Lee Child
 Blue Moon (Hamilton novel), a 1998 Anita Blake: Vampire Hunter novel by Laurell K. Hamilton
 Blue Moon (Noël novel), a 2009 Immortals novel by Alyson Noël

Music

Albums
 Blue Moon (Carmen McRae album), 1956
 Blue Moon (The Marcels album), 1961
 Blue Moon (Sofia Talvik album), 2005
 Blue Moon (Steve Holy album), 2000
 Blue Moon (Toby Keith album), 1996
 Blue Moon, by Robben Ford, 2002

Songs
 "Blue Moon" (1934 song), written by Richard Rodgers and Lorenz Hart
 "Blue Moon" (Beck song), 2014
 "Blue Moon" (Steve Holy song), 2000
 ""Blue Moon" (BtoB song), 2018
 "Blue Moon", by De/Vision, 1995
 "Blue Moon", by Hyolyn with Changmo, 2017
 "Blue Moon", by Upchurch from Creeker II, 2019

Products and companies
 Blue Moon Diner, Gardner, Massachusetts, US
 Blue Moon Tavern, Seattle, Washington, US
 Blue Moon (beer), a Belgian-style witbier manufactured by MillerCoors
 Blue moon (ice cream), a blue-colored ice cream popular in the U.S. Midwest
 Blue Moon Press, a British small press founded by Charles Lahr

Science and technology
 Blue Moon (spacecraft), a robotic cargo carrier and lander design concept for making deliveries to the Moon
 Blue moon butterfly or Hypolimnas bolina, a butterfly species
 Blue moon danio, a freshwater fish
 Blue moon, an astronomical phenomenon caused by the 1883 eruption of Krakatoa

Other uses
 Blue Moon (game), a fantasy card game
 Blue Moon, Kentucky, US
 Blue Moon Odom (born 1945), American baseball pitcher
 Blue Moon of Josephine Diamond, a South African blue diamond

See also
 
 Once in a Blue Moon (disambiguation)
 The Moon Is Blue